Some sources state there are close to 300 beaches in Puerto Rico, while other sources count up to 1,200.  Whatever the number, the Government of Puerto Rico officially recognized 248 of them. In Puerto Rico there are 78 municipalities of which 44 have a coastline.

   – Indicates a Blue Flag beach
   – Indicates camping area
   – Indicates diving or snorkeling area
   – Indicates scuba area
   – Indicates surfing area
   – Indicates lifeguards posted
   – Indicates fishing area
   – Indicates swimming area

Eastern region beaches

Luquillo
Luquillo Beach "La Monserrate",   
Mar Sin Barreras  (Wheelchair accessible section of "La Monserrate" Beach)
Surfing Beach "La Pared"  
Playa Azul Beach

Culebra
Flamenco Beach     
Brava Beach 
Larga Beach 
Carlos Rosario Beach  
Luis Peña Beach  
Punta Soldado Beach   
Resaca Beach 
Zoni Beach   
Tortuga Beach  
Tamarindo Beach   
Sirena Beach

Vieques
Sun Bay Beach  
Playa Negrita (Black Sand Beach)
Barracuda (García) Beach  
Caracas (Red) Beach 
Esperanza Beach  
Gallito Beach 
Playa Grande Beach
La Chiva (Blue) Beach  
La Plata Beach 
Media Luna Beach   
Navio Beach 
Tapón (Hidden) Beach  
Punta Arenas Beach
Natural Reserve Mosquito Bay
Rompeolas (Mosquito Pier)  
Playuela Beach

Maunabo
Los Pinos
Los Bohios Beach 
Punta Tuna Beach 
Larga Beach

Naguabo
Tropical Beach
Húcares Beach

Yabucoa
Lucia Beach
Guayanes Beach 
El Negro Beach

Others
Seven Seas Beach, Las Croabas, Fajardo   
Punta Santiago Beach, Humacao

Northern region beaches

Dorado
Sardinera Beach 
Ritz-Carlton Reserve

Toa Baja
Isla de Cabras Beach
Punta Salinas Beach

Carolina 
Carolina Beach  
Isla Verde Beach

Loiza
Vacia Talega Beach
Piñones Beach 
Aviones Beach

Piñones
Aviones Beach
Posita Beach
Chatarra (Scrap Iron) Beach

San Juan
Balneario del Escambron, Old San Juan  
Playita del Condado
 (Condado Beach)
Ocean Park Beach
Punta Las Marias
Posita Beach

Manati

Los Tubos Beach    
Mar Chiquita Beach, Manati 
Tortuguero Beach, Manati

Barceloneta
Puerto de las Vacas Beach
Las Criollas

Camuy
Peñon Brusi Beach
Amador Beach
Puerto Hermina Beach

Others
Cerro Gordo, Vega Alta  
Mar Bella, Vega Baja
Poza del Obispo Beach, Arecibo

Southern region beaches 

Beaches in the Porta Caribe region:

Guayanilla
 Ventana Beach
Emajagua Beach
Tamarindo Beach

Patillas
Guardarraya Beach
Inches Beach
Escondida Beach
Punta Viento Beach
Villa Pesquera Beach

Ponce

El Tuque
La Guancha Beach
Caja de Muertos Beaches
Playa Pelícano 
Playa Coast Guard
Playa Carrucho
Playa Larga
Isla de Gatas Beach
Playa Cañas
Playa Carenero
Playa de Ponce 
Playa Las Salinas 
Playa Punta Cabuyón 
Playa Vayas

Salinas
Cayo Matias Beach
Salinas Beach

Santa Isabel
Santa Isabel Beach
Jauca Beach
Playa Clavellina

Others
Punta Guilarte Beach, Arroyo 
Peñuelas Beach, Peñuelas

Western region beaches
Beaches that belong to the region of Porta del Sol:

Quebradillas
Guajataca Beach

Isabela
Blue Hole Beach 
La Pocita de Isabela  
Golondrinas Cave Beach
Bajura Beach
Baño La Princesa & Blowhole Beach 
Guajataca Beach 
Jobos Beach  
El Pastillo Beach 
Montones Beach 
Punta Sardinera Beach 
Shacks Beach  
Pozo Teodoro Beach 
Middles Beach

Aguadilla

Crash Boat Beach     
La Ponderosa Beach
La Poza Beach 
La Saldinera Beach
Gas Chambers
Wilderness
Peña Blanca Beach
Schoolyards Beach

Aguada
Aguada Beach
Pico Piedra
Playa Espinar

Rincon

Many of Rincon's beaches are frequented for surfing.
Balneario de Rincón 
Corcega Beach
Domes Beach 
María's Beach
Sandy Beach 
Steps Beach
Tres Palmas

Añasco
Balneario Tres Hermanos

Mayagüez
Beaches of Mona Island

Cabo Rojo
Boquerón  
Playa Buye
Combate
La Playuela (Playa Sucia)
Playa La Mela
Punta Arenas Beach
Isla de Ratones

Lajas
Playita Rosada
Cayo Caracoles
Cayo Mata la Gata
Cayo Enrique

Guánica 
Las Paldas
La Jungla
Playa Santa
Ballenas
Gilligan's Island
Atolladora Beach
Playa Manglillo Pequeño
Tamarindo Beach
Caña Gorda Beach
Jaboncillo Beach

Gallery

See also 

List of beaches
List of beaches in the United States

References

External links

 Playas de Puerto Rico

 
Beaches

Puerto Rico